Gábor Horváth (born 4 July 1985) is a retired Hungarian football player.

Career statistics

International statistics
Updated 13 August 2009

Honours
 Hungarian Player of the Year: 2009–10

External links
 Profile

1985 births
Living people
Sportspeople from Székesfehérvár
Hungarian footballers
Association football defenders
Hungary international footballers
Fehérvár FC players
NAC Breda players
ADO Den Haag players
Paksi FC players
Nemzeti Bajnokság I players
Eredivisie players
Hungarian expatriate footballers
Expatriate footballers in the Netherlands
Hungarian expatriate sportspeople in the Netherlands